First Hill Park is a public park in Seattle's First Hill neighborhood, in the United States. The park opened in 1987 and underwent a renovation in 2021.

References

External links
 

1987 establishments in Washington (state)
First Hill, Seattle
Parks in Seattle